One Inch Masters is the third full-length album by American garage rock band Gas Huffer. It was released in 1994 on Epitaph Records.

Critical reception 
Dave Thompson, in Alternative Rock, called the album's sound "unique" and wrote that it lives "noisily in the cracks between pop-punk and hardcore." The Staten Island Advance determined that "the band's no-holds-barred approach incorporates some the best elements of revved-up rockabilly, '60s-styled garage-rock, surf and hot-rod sounds, '70s-styled riff-heavy, punk slop, in the vein of early Stones, Stooges, N.Y. Dolls, Damned, Mekons, with a shots of Memphis soul grooves and hot hillbilly twang thrown in."

Track listing 
  "Crooked Bird"
  "Mr. Sudbuster"
  "More of Everything"
  "Stay in Your House"
  "14th & Jefferson"
  "Walla Walla Bang Bang"
  "Appendix Gone"
  "Chicken Foot"
  "What's in the Bag?"
  "Hand of the Nomad"
  "Quasimodo '94"
  "No Smoking"
  "Action/Adventure"
  "Goat No Have"

References 

Gas Huffer albums
1994 albums